Perserikatan Sepakbola Sleman ( 'Sleman Football Union'), or mostly known through its abbreviation PSS, is a professional football club based in Sleman Regency, Special Region of Yogyakarta, Indonesia. The club competes in the Liga 1 , the top-tier of Indonesian football, after winning promotion from Liga 2 in 2018. The club dons the nickname Super Elang Jawa (English: Super Java Eagles).

History
PSS was established in 1976 as a regional football association for amateur clubs (known as Perserikatan) in Sleman, the third of its kind in Yogyakarta province after PSIM Yogyakarta and Persiba Bantul. PSS needed 24 years to reach the top-tier of the amateur Perserikatan competitions in 2000. After six years in the premier division, PSS was unable to complete the 2006 season after suffering from the 2006 Yogyakarta earthquake that killed more than 5,000 people and damaged thousands of buildings. However, the Indonesian football association PSSI did not relegate the three teams from Yogyakarta province, including PSS, although they forfeited their remaining games due to the earthquake's impact on their facilities and personal lives.

PSS left the top flight of Indonesian football in 2008 due to administrative matters. The club could not quickly adjust to the shift towards professional football with the launching of the  Indonesian Super League (ISL) that year. ISL required Perserikatan clubs to wean off from their dependence on their region's state budget. Teams like PSS that continued to rely on the government had to compete in the second tier, which persistently used the Perserikatan's name for its top division (Divisi Utama). Amid heavy pressure from fans, PSS became a professional team in 2012 after the incorporation of PT Putra Sleman Sembada, the company that now manages the club. That move ensured PSS could return to the top flight if they manage to win promotion. PSS did so after winning the 2018 Liga 2 competition.

Statistics

Season by season record 

Key to league record:
 Pos = Final position
 P = Played
 W = Games won
 D = Games drawn
 L = Games lost
 GF = Goals for
 GA = Goals against
 GD = Goal difference
 Pts = Points

Key to rounds:
 W = Winner
 F = Final
 SF = Semi-finals
 QF = Quarter-finals
 R16 = Round of 16
 R32 = Round of 32
 R64 = Round of 64
 R5 = Fifth round
 R4 = Fourth round
 R3 = Third round
 R2 = Second round
 R1 = First round
 GS = Group stage

Key to competitions
 Cup = Piala Indonesia
 CL = AFC Champions League
 AC = AFC Cup

Seasons

Stadium         
PSS in 2007 began to use its current home base Maguwoharjo Stadium after construction was disrupted by the earthquake a year before. Maguwoharjo's southern tribune, where the club's ultras occupy, is known as one of the loudest tribunes in Indonesia with non-stop 90-minute chanting.

Fans
PSS is known for its loyal and creative ultras. Supported by two fan clubs, the north tribune Slemania  and the south tribune Brigata Curva Sud 1976 (BCS), PSS' current form cannot be extricated from the dedication of supporters who strive to improve their team's managerial quality. The older one, Slemania, was established in 2000 in line with the promotion to top-flight football while BCS emerged in 2011 in the run-up to the 2012 professionalization of PSS.

Besides its popularity as the fan club with one of the best choreographies in Asia, BCS is known for its tough scrutiny over PSS management. BCS boycotted games in the 2020 Liga 1 over disappointment with the level of professionalism in PSS and only ended its strike in 2021 after a massive restructuring that has led to improvements in how the club is managed. BCS is particularly aware of concerns among female spectators when they are in a packed stadium, leading to the formation of its own female arm to ensure safety in the tribune.

The song "Sampai Kau Bisa" (Until You Can) is the anthem that fans sing after the match. The anthem symbolizes fan loyalty to the team in good and bad times, knowing the club went through trials until it earned its spot in top-flight football. PSS fan clubs have a policy of zero insults for opposing teams during 90 minutes of a football game, making them the friendliest ultras in Indonesia football. Their chants are exclusive to motivating PSS.

Players

Current squad

Naturalized players

Out on loan

Club officials

Board of commissioners and directors

Team management

Coaches

Honours

National League 
Liga Indonesia First Division / Liga 2
Winners:  2018
 Runners-up: 2000
Indonesian Premier Division 
Winners: 2013
Indonesia Soccer Championship B
 Runners-up: 2016

National Tournament 
Menpora Cup
 Third place: 2021

References

External links
Official site
Fans site
Fans site

 
Football clubs in Indonesia
Football clubs in the Special Region of Yogyakarta
Association football clubs established in 1976
1976 establishments in Indonesia